Ingolv Helland (29 March 1906 –  9 April 1999) was a Norwegian politician for Venstre.

He was born in Hamre.

He was elected to the Norwegian Parliament from Rogaland in 1961, and was re-elected in 1965.

References

1906 births
1999 deaths
Liberal Party (Norway) politicians
Members of the Storting
20th-century Norwegian politicians